Jamaan Al-Harbash was a member of the Kuwaiti National Assembly, representing the second district.

Against Falcon Smuggling
On April 17, 2007, Al-Harbash and other MPs submitted documents to parliament claiming that several falcon shipments for "influential people" had been imported recently without proper testing.  Kuwat banned bird imports as an avian influenza precaution, but the ban was eased since July 2006. Al-Harbash sees the smuggling as an example of corruption that puts the country at risk for bird flu: "Lifting the ban on falcons was a catastrophe. Why were they exempted from the ban despite warnings by doctors?"  Al-Harbash says he will ask the parliament's health committee to study the situation and report back.

Kuwait reported 20 birds, including 18 falcons, tested positive for the deadly H5N1 strain of the bird flu on February 25 and so far the bird flu cases have reached to 132.  In November 2005, Kuwait detected the first case of a bird infected with the H5N1 strain—a flamingo at a seaside villa.

Protested Against Israeli Attacks
On December 28, 2008, Kuwaiti lawmakers Mikhled Al-Azmi, Musallam Al-Barrak, Marzouq Al-Ghanim, Jaaman Al-Harbash, Ahmad Al-Mulaifi, Mohammad Hayef Al-Mutairi, Ahmad Al-Saadoun, Nasser Al-Sane, and Waleed Al-Tabtabaie protested in front of the National Assembly building against the attacks by Israel on Gaza. Protesters waved banners reading, "No to hunger, no to submission"

Israel launched air strikes against Hamas in the Gaza Strip on December 26 after a six-month ceasefire ended on December 18.

References

1970 births
Living people
Members of the National Assembly (Kuwait)
Academic staff of Kuwait University
Kuwait University alumni
Hadas politicians
Kuwaiti Muslim Brotherhood members